Daniel "Danny" McDaid (born 4 August 1941) is a 2-time Irish Olympic athlete and four times national marathon champion from Letterkenny, County Donegal, Ireland. He is a former member of the Dublin-based athletic club Clonliffe Harriers.

He competed for Ireland at two Olympic Games, Munich 1972 and Montreal 1976. He was the first Irishman to cross the finish line at the 1972 games. He took part in nine World Championships, first competing for Ireland in the International Cross Country Championships in Madrid in 1969. He finished 11th in Limerick in 1979 when John Treacy lifted the world title for Ireland. He was captain of the Irish Senior Cross Country team from 1975 to 1981.

The running track at the Letterkenny Regional Sports and Leisure Complex is named in his honour. The Danny McDaid 15k, which begins and concludes at this track, is also named after him.

He once served as a postman in the Letterkenny area. He is currently a member of Letterkenny Athletic Club.

He has three daughters. Orla, Niamh, Ciara and a son Darragh.

Achievements in Major Finals

References

External links 
 
 
 

1941 births
Living people
Irish male middle-distance runners
Irish male long-distance runners
Olympic athletes of Ireland
People from Letterkenny
Sportspeople from County Donegal
Athletes (track and field) at the 1972 Summer Olympics
Athletes (track and field) at the 1976 Summer Olympics